Futbol Clube Estelí is a Nicaraguan football team playing in the second division of the Nicaragua football system. It is based in Estelí.

History
Founded in April 2012, FC Estelí immediately won promotion to the Nicaraguan Second Division in 2012.

Current squad

Achievements
Segunda División de Nicaragua: 0
TBD

Coaches
 TBD

References

External links
 

Football clubs in Nicaragua
Association football clubs established in 2012
2012 establishments in Nicaragua
Estelí